Nise: The Heart of Madness is a 2015 Brazilian docudrama directed by Roberto Berliner. Starring Glória Pires, the film is based on the life of psychiatrist Nise da Silveira, a pioneer of occupational therapy in Brazil. Nise also features Fabrício Boliveira, Fernando Eiras, Perfeito Fortuna, Roberta Rodrigues, Augusto Madeira, Simone Mazzer, and Zé Carlos Machado.

Plot

In 1944, the doctor Nise da Silveira returns to work in a psychiatric hospital in the suburbs of Rio de Janeiro and refuses to use electroshock and lobotomy in the treatment of schizophrenics. Insulated from the other doctors, she must reorganize the abandoned occupational-therapy sector, where she forms a new clinical approach of listening and observing, further alienating herself from her colleagues. Insisting that those under her care be referred to as clients, rather than patients, she encourages the freedom of expression through art, discovering her clients' talents. She opens the Casa das Palmeiras, a clinic and studio, at the hospital, and later starts a museum dedicated to her clients' artwork.

Production

According to director Roberto Berliner, the idea for Nise came from Bernardo Horta, brother of the film's director of photography, André Horta. André started organizing some of da Silveira's writing, then passed the project to Berliner in 2003. In all, research for the film took 13 years.

Release

The film was released over 3 years in different parts of the world. In 2015, it was released in Japan. Throughout 2016, it was released in Sweden, France, Brazil, and the Netherlands. In 2017, it was released in the United States by Outsider Pictures and Strand Releasing.
In 2018, it was released to selected (about 600) screens in mainland China from January 5 through February 4.

Reception

Critical response

Neil Genzlinger of The New York Times called it "a mesmerizing drama", Daphne Howland of The Village Voice wrote "the actors’ portrayals ... ring true", Jonathan Holland of The Hollywood Reporter called it "heartwarming but unsentimental", and J. R. Jones of the Chicago Reader wrote that it "has its powerful moments but ... turns into a black-and-white struggle between a caring, enlightened woman and a cadre of hard-hearted, benighted men."

Accolades

|-
|rowspan=3|2015
|Nise: The Heart of Madness
|Tokyo International Film Festival Audience Award for Best Film
|
|-
|Glória Pires
|Tokyo International Film Festival Grand Prix for Best Actress
|
|-
| rowspan=3 |Nise: The Heart of Madness
|Rio Film Festival Audience Award
|
|-
| rowspan=2 |2016
|IndieWire Critic's Poll Best Undistributed Film
|
|-
|IndieWire Critic's Poll Best Overlooked Film
|

References

Brazilian biographical drama films
2015 biographical drama films
Biographical films about physicians
2010s Portuguese-language films
Science docudramas
2015 drama films
2015 films
Docudrama films